Sympetrum danae, the black darter or black meadowhawk is a dragonfly found in northern Europe, Asia, and North America. It is a very active late summer insect typical of heathland and moorland bog pools.

Members of the genus Sympetrum are known as darters in the UK and as meadowhawks in the US and Canada.

Identification
Both sexes have black legs and pterostigmata and a very broad base to the hind wing. The thorax has yellow sides separated by a bold black panel in which are three yellow spots, resembling a highland darter (Sympetrum nigrescens).

The male has a mainly black thorax and abdomen. The abdomen has small yellow marks on the side, that darken with age. The wings are clear.

The female has black legs and brown eyes. The abdomen is mainly yellow, becoming browner with age. It has small yellow patches at the wing bases.

Breeding

This darter is restricted to acidic shallow pools, lake margins and ditches in lowland heath and moorland bogs, usually with bog-mosses and rushes. Eggs are laid in flight by dipping the tip of the abdomen into the water. The eggs hatch the following spring and the larvae develop very rapidly, emerging after as little as two months.
 Females tend to choose where to lay their eggs based on the appearance of the site. Female Meadowhawks also base the location of their oviposition on temperature. The females tend to gravitate more towards cooler climates rather than warmer climates. They are also likely to choose an oviposition site that contains little to no predators within the surrounding area.

Population and conservation
In the British Isles, this dragonfly is very locally distributed in the lowlands, but more widespread in the north-west and Ireland. It is often very locally abundant and maybe this triggers dispersal. Records from the south coast suggest that immigration from the continent does occur. Its main threats, however, are development, drainage, agriculture, and peat extraction.

Diet
The immature Meadowhawk dragonflies feed on a various organisms that can be found in aquatic environments. Some of these insects include fly larvae, mosquito larva, mayfly larvae, shrimp, and other types of fish. 
The adult Meadowhawks feed on smaller, typically flying insects. Many of their diet consists of insects from the order Diptera. This includes mosquitoes, flies, moth, mayflies, and even insects like mites or termites.

Reproductive structures
One factor that distinguishes the female dragonfly from the male is the presence of two spermatheca, this trait is absent in males. Females also obtain spherical bursa copulatrix. Male dragonflies, on the other hand, possess copulatory organs that aid them during sperm competition. During this process, the males have the capability of removing the sperm of previous mates from the female and replacing it with their own sperm. Males can also be distinguished by their genitalia which is uniquely four-segmented.

Development
The development of the Sympetrum danae is divided into seven different phases. The first phase begins with newly developed eggs. When eggs are first layer they are white in color, but after approximately 18 hours after, they become a grayish color. The second phase takes place four days later when the structure of the yolk alters. It is then followed by the third stage on the eighth days. During this stage the germ plate becomes visible to the naked eye. The fourth stage occurs on the tenth day. This is when segmentation throughout the body becomes noticeable. Then, on the second week the fifth stage occurs. The eyes, mouthparts, and antennae develop during this particular stage. Many days later, on the 189th day, the sixth stage takes place and the embryo flips 180 degrees. Lastly, the seventh stage. This happens on the 197th day and it is when development is complete. The dragonfly typically hatches from its shell 217 days after it was oviposited.

Female v. Male Activity
Meadowhawk males are typically more active in the morning hours. They spent most of their mornings in search of females to mate with. Their activity lessens in the afternoon. Female Meadowhawks are the opposite. They tend to be more dormant in the early hours and more active at night. Male dragonflies are likely to be more active near ponds and bodies of water. Oppositely, females tend to be less active when near the water and prefer to be in areas with overgrown plants and grasses. Female dragonflies typically only go to the water when they are in search of a mate or if they are laying their eggs. Unlike female dragonflies, males have two different types of flight: search flight and patrol flight.

References

External links

Black Meadowhawk, Talk about Wildlife, Archive link
Black Meadowhawk, Insects of Alberta
Black Meadowhawk, NaturePhoto-CZ
Black Meadowhawk, Iowa Odonata Survey

Libellulidae
Odonata of Asia
Dragonflies of Europe
Odonata of North America
Insects described in 1776
Taxa named by Johann Heinrich Sulzer
Articles containing video clips